Ulubağ is a village in Turkey's Şanlıurfa Province, in the eastern part of its Haliliye district. As of the 1990 census, it had a population of 338. The cemetery area in the north side of the village exists on top of an archaeological mound measuring 60 m in diameter and 3 m in height. An archaeological survey in 1963 encountered artifacts from the Chalcolithic (Halaf and Ubaid periods), early Bronze Age, and Roman and Byzantine periods.

References 

Villages in Şanlıurfa Province